Nadupuru is a Resedential area  of the city of Visakhapatnam state of Andhra Pradesh, India.

Transport

APSRTC routes

References

Neighbourhoods in Visakhapatnam